Taraji Penda Henson (born September 11, 1970) is an American actress. She studied acting at Howard University and began her Hollywood career in guest roles on several television shows before making her breakthrough in Baby Boy (2001). She played a prostitute in Hustle & Flow (2005), for which she received a Screen Actors Guild Award for Outstanding Performance by a Cast in a Motion Picture nomination; and a single mother of a disabled child in David Fincher's The Curious Case of Benjamin Button (2008), for which she received Academy Award, SAG Award and Critics Choice Award nominations for Best Supporting Actress. In 2010, she appeared in the action comedy Date Night, and co-starred in the remake of The Karate Kid alongside Jaden Smith and Jackie Chan.

Henson has also had an extensive and successful career in television, including series such as The Division, Boston Legal and Eli Stone. In 2011, she starred in the Lifetime Television film Taken from Me: The Tiffany Rubin Story, which brought her a nomination for the Primetime Emmy Award for Outstanding Lead Actress in a Limited Series or Movie. From 2011 to 2013, she co-starred as Detective Jocelyn Carter in the CBS drama Person of Interest, for which she won an NAACP Image Award. She starred in the ensemble films Think Like a Man (2012) and its 2014 sequel. In 2015, she began starring as Cookie Lyon in the Fox drama series Empire, for which she became the first African-American woman to win a Critics' Choice Television Award for Best Actress in a Drama Series. She also won a Golden Globe Award; and was nominated for Emmy Awards in 2015 and 2016.

In 2016, Time named Henson one of the 100 most influential people in the world. That year, she released a New York Times best selling autobiography titled Around the Way Girl. Also that year, she was praised for her starring role as NASA mathematician Katherine Johnson in the critically acclaimed biographical drama film Hidden Figures, for which she won a Screen Actors Guild Award for Outstanding Performance by a Cast in a Motion Picture.

Early life and education
Henson was born September 11, 1970, in Southeast Washington, D.C., the daughter of Bernice (née Gordon), a corporate manager at Woodward & Lothrop, and Boris Lawrence Henson, a janitor and metal fabricator. She has often spoken of the influence of her maternal grandmother, Patsy Ballard, who accompanied her at the Academy Awards the year she was nominated. Her first and middle names are of Swahili origin: Taraji ("hope") and Penda ("love"). According to a mitochondrial DNA analysis, her matrilineal lineage can be traced to the Masa people of Cameroon. She has said that North Pole explorer Matthew Henson was "the brother of my great-great-grandfather."

Henson graduated from Oxon Hill High School in Oxon Hill, Maryland, in 1988. She attended North Carolina Agricultural and Technical State University, where she intended to study electrical engineering, before transferring to Howard University to study drama. To pay for college, she worked mornings as a secretary at The Pentagon and evenings as a singing-dancing waitress on a dinner-cruise ship, the Spirit of Washington.

Film career

Early career (2001–2014) 
Henson received her SAG membership card in the early 1990s for doing three roles as a background performer. Her first prominent role was in the 2001 comedy-drama film Baby Boy, where she portrayed Yvette, alongside singer Tyrese Gibson.

In 2005, Henson was in the independent film Hustle & Flow as Shug, the love interest of Terrence Howard, who portrayed the male lead DJay. She made her singing debut in the film, which was nominated for two Academy awards and won one. In 2008, she appeared with Brad Pitt in The Curious Case of Benjamin Button, where she played Queenie, Benjamin's mother, and for which she received an Academy Award nomination for Best Supporting Actress. In an interview with Lauren Viera of The Chicago Tribune, she noted that "Queenie is the embodiment of unconditional love."

Henson acted in two Tyler Perry films, The Family That Preys in 2008 and I Can Do Bad All By Myself in 2009. In 2010, she appeared in the remake of The Karate Kid with Jaden Smith and Jackie Chan. Though reviews were lackluster, the film was a commercial success.

In 2011, Henson starred as Tiffany Rubin in the Lifetime Movie Network film Taken from Me: The Tiffany Rubin Story. It was based on true events in the life of a New York woman whose son, Kobe, was abducted by his biological father to South Korea. Her portrayal of Rubin received positive reviews and earned her several award nominations, including a Primetime Emmy Award for Outstanding Lead Actress in a Miniseries or a Movie.

In 2012, Henson was in the large ensemble cast film Think Like a Man, based on Steve Harvey's 2009 book Act Like a Lady, Think Like a Man. She reprised the role in the film's sequel, Think Like a Man Too, released in June 2014.

Hidden Figures and beyond (2015–present) 
In 2016, Henson starred in the biographical drama film Hidden Figures, a major box-office success nominated for numerous awards, including three Oscars (Best Picture, Best Adapted Screenplay, and Best Supporting Actress for Octavia Spencer) and two Golden Globes (Best Supporting Actress for Spencer and Best Original Score). It won the Screen Actors Guild Award for Outstanding Performance by a Cast in a Motion Picture.

In January 2018, she starred in Sony Screen Gems's thriller-drama film Proud Mary, as a hit woman whose life is turned around when she meets a young boy who awakens the maternal instinct she never knew she had. In March, she starred in the film Tyler Perry's Acrimony as a faithful wife who, after tiring of standing by her husband, is enraged when she believes herself betrayed. In November, she voiced the character Yesss in Disney's Ralph Breaks the Internet, a sequel to the studio's Wreck-It Ralph.

In February 2019, Henson starred in What Men Want (based on the 2000 Mel Gibson romantic comedy What Women Want) as a female sports agent, looked down upon by male colleagues, who gains the power to hear men's thoughts. In April 2019, she starred in the historical drama The Best of Enemies, portraying civil rights activist Ann Atwater.

Henson is also slated to star in and produce The Emmett Till Story, a film about Emmett Till, a 14-year-old black Chicago teen who was abducted, tortured, murdered, and dumped in a river by two white men in rural Mississippi in 1955. Henson will play Till's mother, Mamie.

Television career
Henson has guest-starred on several television shows, including The WB's Smart Guy, the Fox series House in 2005, and CBS's CSI: Crime Scene Investigation in 2006. She also appeared in an episode of Sister, Sister.

Additionally, Henson has been a cast member on several television shows, including Lifetime's The Division and ABC's Boston Legal for one season. Her recurring characters include Angela Scott on ABC's Eli Stone. In 2011, she was cast in the CBS crime-suspense series Person of Interest. In the November 20, 2013, episode, "The Crossing", after co-starring for two and a half years, Henson's character, 'Joss' Carter was killed as part of the series' new storyline. In February 2014, several months after her last Person of Interest episode, Henson was hired by Fox to star in Empire, a musical drama set in the hip hop recording industry, where she plays Cookie Lyon opposite former Hustle & Flow costar Terrence Howard. Fox ordered the pilot in May 2014, and the series debuted on January 7, 2015, with positive critical reviews and wide commercial success. The role brought Henson widespread recognition and critical acclaim. In July 2015, she was nominated for the Primetime Emmy Award for Outstanding Lead Actress in a Drama Series, and submitted the show's pilot for Emmy voting. In January 2016, she won the Golden Globe Award for Best Actress – Television Series Drama for Empire, becoming only the third African-American actress to take home the award after Gail Fisher (1972) and Regina Taylor (1992). At the 46th NAACP Image Awards, she was named the 2015 Entertainer of the Year for her roles in Empire and No Good Deed.

In 2015, Henson teamed up with Howard to produce and host a variety holiday special for Fox, Taraji and Terrence's White Hot Holidays. The special was produced again in 2016 and 2017, without Howard.

In July 2020, it was reported that a spin-off Empire series focusing on Henson's character, Cookie Lyon, was in development, with Henson producing and starring, as part of Henson's two-year first-look deal with 20th Century Fox Television through her production company, TPH Entertainment. The deal includes developing projects for the network across multiple platforms. Henson said she hopes to tackle a number of sensitive topics while cultivating young, fresh voices. FOX has since decided to not move forward with the spin-off, currently putting the series on hold.

In December 2020, Henson began hosting the talk show Peace of Mind with Taraji on Facebook Watch. On December 2, 2021, Henson played the role of Miss Hannigan in Annie Live! on NBC.

Other work
Henson made her singing debut in the film Hustle & Flow, where she provided the vocals for the Three 6 Mafia track "It's Hard out Here for a Pimp". The song won an Academy Award for Best Original Song in 2006, giving Three 6 Mafia the distinction of becoming the first African-American hip hop act to win in that category. Henson and the group performed the song at the live Oscar ceremony on March 5, 2006. She also sang "In My Daughter's Eyes" on the 2006 charity album Unexpected Dreams – Songs From the Stars.

Henson has made several appearances in music videos and television. In 2005, she starred in the rapper Common's music video "Testify" as the wife of a soon-to-be-convicted murderer, and appeared in Tyrese Gibson's music video "Stay" as his love interest. On March 16, 2015, she was a guest co-host on Live! with Kelly and Michael, filling in for Kelly Ripa.

Henson collaborated with MAC Cosmetics to create the Taraji P. Henson makeup collection in late August 2016. The #MACTaraji collection debuted the following month. In November 2016, she again collaborated with MAC as the spokesperson for their Viva Glam Campaign, along with Jussie Smollett, to benefit the MAC HIV/AIDS fund. Their collection debuted in February 2017.

Henson has appeared in a few stage roles, including a production of August Wilson's Joe Turner's Come and Gone and the Pasadena Playhouse's Above the Fold.
 She also started The Boris Lawrence Henson Foundation. Named after her father, it deals with cultural mental illness.

On April 1, 2022, Henson was appointed by President Joe Biden to the President's Board of Advisors on Historically Black Colleges and Universities.

Personal life
In 1994, Henson gave birth to her son Marcell. His father, Henson's high-school sweetheart William LaMarr Johnson, was murdered in 2003. In 2014, Henson said that her son had been racially profiled by police and that his car had been illegally searched during a traffic stop in Glendale, California. A video obtained by the Los Angeles Times showed Marcell had driven through a lighted crosswalk while a pedestrian was crossing, given verbal consent to search his vehicle, and admitted to smoking marijuana two hours before driving. Hashish oil and marijuana were found inside the car. Forty minutes after the video was made public, Henson said in an Instagram message, "I would like to publicly apologize to the officer and the Glendale Police Department. A mother's job is not easy, and neither is a police officer's."

A supporter of People for the Ethical Treatment of Animals (PETA), Henson appeared nude in an ad for the I'd Rather Be Naked Than Wear Fur campaign in January 2011. She joined PETA again for their 2013 campaign, "Be an Angel for Animals", where Henson posed with her family dog Uncle Willie. "Chained dogs suffer day in and day out," the ad stated. "They are cold, hungry, thirsty, vulnerable, and lonely. Keep them inside, where it's safe and warm." 

Henson posed nude for the May issue of Allure magazine in 2012. In February 2015, Henson was featured in an ad for the NOH8 Campaign supporting the LGBT community. In late 2017, she switched to a vegan diet.

On May 13, 2018, Henson got engaged to former NFL player Kelvin Hayden. She disclosed the end of their engagement during the October 19, 2020, episode of The Breakfast Club.

Henson is a Christian and considers acting to be a spiritual experience.

Filmography

Key

Film

Television

Awards and nominations

Henson has received many accolades for her work in film and television. In 2015, Henson won the Critics' Choice Television Award for Best Actress in a Drama Series (for Empire), and became the first black actress in the history of the awards show to do so. She also won a Golden Globe in the same category for the series. Additionally, Henson has received nominations for the Academy Award for Best Supporting Actress (for The Curious Case of Benjamin Button), multiple Screen Actors Guild Awards (winning Outstanding Motion Picture Cast in 2017 for Hidden Figures) and three Primetime Emmy Awards (for Taken from Me: The Tiffany Rubin Story and Empire).

References

External links

 
 
 
 
 
 Taraji P. Henson  at TV.com 

1970 births
20th-century American actresses
21st-century American actresses
Actresses from Washington, D.C.
African-American actresses
American film actresses
American television actresses
American voice actresses
Best Drama Actress Golden Globe (television) winners
Howard University alumni
Living people
North Carolina A&T State University alumni
Outstanding Performance by a Cast in a Motion Picture Screen Actors Guild Award winners
People from Oxon Hill, Maryland
American LGBT rights activists
African-American Christians
Shorty Award winners
20th-century African-American women
20th-century African-American people
21st-century African-American women
American people of Cameroonian descent